Cameron Corner is an outback locality in the Shire of Bulloo, Queensland, Australia. It borders New South Wales to the south and South Australia to the west.

Geography 
The noted Dingo Fence passes through Cameron Corner along the New South Wales border.

Cameron Corner has the following mountains (from north to south):

 Mount Intrepid 
 Mount Morris 
 Mount Bygrave

History

This general area, which includes Sturt Stony Desert in the Lake Eyre Basin, was first explored by Captain Charles Sturt, who in 1844 went in search of a supposed inland sea in the centre of Australia.

The corner and locality are named for the surveyor, John Brewer Cameron, from the New South Wales Lands Department, who spent two years during 1880–1882 marking the border between New South Wales and Queensland. Cameron erected a post there in September 1880 to mark its intersection with the border of South Australia. He placed a wooden marker every  eastwards along the interstate boundary.

On 17 April 2020, the Queensland Government reorganised the nine localities in the Shire of Bulloo, resulting in six localities. It included Cameron Corner gaining a small portion of land from the west of the locality of Bulloo Downs.

Heritage listings

Dingo Fence 

The  section of the Dingo Fence in Queensland is also known as the Great Barrier Fence or Wild Dog Barrier Fence 11. It is administered by the Department of Agriculture and Fisheries. The Wild Dog Barrier Fence staff consists of 23 employees, including two-person teams that patrol a  section of the fence once every week. There are depots at Quilpie and Roma.

The Queensland Border Fence stretches for  westwards along the border with New South Wales, into the Strzelecki Desert. The fence passes the point where the three states of Queensland, New South Wales and South Australia meet (Cameron Corner). At this point, it connects with the South Australian Border Fence, which runs for  southwards along the border with New South Wales.

Economy 
There are a number of homesteads in the locality, including (from north to south):

 Orientos
 Tennappera
 Epsilon
 Santos
 Naryilco
 Omicron

Events 
 New Year's Eve is celebrated three times each year in Cameron Corner (also in Poeppel Corner and Surveyor Generals Corner), because the three states that meet at the corner are in three time zones.

Facilities
The Cameron Corner Store was established in 1990 by a Vietnam War veteran, Sandy Nall, and his wife Cathrine. As of 2014, the store was operated by the sole permanent residents of Cameron Corner, Fenn and Cheryl Miller. The store reportedly has a Queensland liquor licence, a New South Wales postal code and a South Australian telephone number.

The locality also features a desert golf course.

References

External links

Borders of South Australia
Borders of New South Wales
Borders of Queensland
South West Queensland
Survey marks in Queensland
Shire of Bulloo
Localities in Queensland